Zelah may refer to:

 Zelah, Cornwall, village in Cornwall named after the Biblical Zelah
 Zelah, Judea, place mentioned in the Bible
 Zelah Clarke (born 1954), English actress

See also
 Selah